"Break It to Me Gently" is a pop song written by blues musician Joe Seneca with lyrics by Diane Lampert. Both Brenda Lee and Juice Newton met with considerable success with their versions of the song.

Brenda Lee recorded "Break It to Me Gently" on August 31, 1961, with Owen Bradley producing the session at his Bradley Film and Recording Studio in Nashville: after another track from the same session, "Fool #1", had become a Top Ten hit.  "Break It To Me Gently" was released as a single at the end of 1961 and reached number four on the US Billboard Hot 100 in January 1962.  In 2008, the Brenda Lee version of the song was featured at the closing of season 2, episode 7 of the AMC series Mad Men. Lee's "Break It to Me Gently" is on the track list of the CD Pan Am: Music From and Inspired By the Original Series set for release January 17, 2012.

Juice Newton remake

Juice Newton had included "Break It to Me Gently" in the set list for her 1981 national tour: New York Times music critic Stephen Holden terming Newton's "steamy version" of the song the concert's highlight. Newton made her recording of the song at Soundcastle Studio in Hollywood CA on January 11, 1982: this was the first session of recording the tracks which would compose Newton's Quiet Lies album whose lead single: "Love's Been a Little Bit Hard on Me" was the one other track recorded in that session. Issued as the second single from Quiet Lies in August 1982, "Break It to Me Gently" just missed becoming Newton's fifth consecutive Top Ten hit on the Billboard Hot 100 peaking at number 11 that October. The track reached number one on the US Adult Contemporary chart (making it Newton's third number one on that chart), and number two on the US country singles chart. Newton won the Grammy Award for Best Country Vocal Performance, Female, for her performance of the song. Newton would score two more Top 40 pop hits and numerous Top 40 country hits after "Break It to Me Gently".

Personnel
Juice Newton: lead vocals
Chuck Martin: electric guitar and solo
George Doering: electric guitar
Fred Tackett: acoustic guitar
Richard Tee: keyboards
Michael Boddicker: synthesizer
George Hawkins: bass
Rick Shlosser: drums

Chart performance

Weekly charts
Brenda Lee

Year-end charts

Juice Newton

Johnny Hallyday version (in French) 

The French rendering "Quitte-moi doucement" was recorded by Johnny Hallyday.

Track listings 
7-inch EP Philips 432.908 BE (1963, France, Spain, etc.)
A1. "Les bras en croix" (2:13)
A2. "Quitte-moi doucement" ("Break It to Me Gently") (2:30)
B1. "Quand un air vous possède" ("When My Little Girl Is Smiling") (2:17)
B2. "Dis-moi oui" ("We Say Yeah") (2:07)

7-inch single "Ma guitare / Quitte-moi doucement" Philips JF 328 009 (1963, Netherlands)
 A. "Ma guitare" (1:50)
 AA. "Quitte-moi doucement" (2:15)

Other cover versions
"Break It to Me Gently" has also been recorded by Ruth Brown, Linda Martin, Lorrie Morgan, Bobby Rydell and Guy Lombardo.

An alternate French rendering, "Brise doucement notre amour", was recorded by Québécois singer Michèle Richard (fr). Deana Martin recorded "Break It To Me Gently" on her 2013 album Destination Moon. In 2016, Aubrey Peeples performed the song at the Grand Ole Opry.

See also
List of number-one adult contemporary singles of 1982 (U.S.)

References

External links
 
 

1961 songs
1962 singles
1982 songs
1982 singles
Songs written by Joe Seneca
Brenda Lee songs
Juice Newton songs
Johnny Hallyday songs
Decca Records singles
Capitol Records singles
Philips Records singles
Torch songs